Chekira Lockhart Hypolite is a Dominican politician from the Dominica Labour Party. She is currently the Member of Parliament for Roseau South.

She was elected in the 2019 general election.

References 

Living people
Dominica women in politics
21st-century women politicians
Members of the House of Assembly of Dominica
Dominica Labour Party politicians
People from Roseau
Year of birth missing (living people)